The 2003 Ball State Cardinals football team represented Ball State University during the 2003 NCAA Division I-A football season. The Cardinals were led by Brady Hoke in his first season as the program's 14th head coach. The Cardinals played their home games at Ball State Stadium as members of the West Division of the Mid-American Conference (MAC). They finished the season 4–8, 3–5 in MAC play to finish in fourth place in the West Division.

Schedule

References

Ball State
Ball State Cardinals football seasons
Ball State Cardinals football